HMS Avon Vale (pennant number L06) was an escort destroyer of the Hunt Type II class. The Royal Navy ordered Avon Vales construction three days after the outbreak of the Second World War.  John Brown Shipbuilding & Engineering Company Ltd laid down her keel at their Clydebank yard on 12 February 1940, as Admiralty Job Number J1569. After a successful Warship Week national savings campaign in February 1942, Avon Vale was adopted by the civil community of Trowbridge, Wiltshire.

Career

Early operations
Avon Vale began her career on convoy duty in the North Western Approaches with the Irish sea force. The destroyer was worked up at Scapa Flow with ships of the Home Fleet in March, being redeployed with the Irish Sea Force for convoy defence in Irish Sea in April.

In July, Avon Vale was deployed for escort duties in a Malta convoy GM1, which consisted a passage through the Western Mediterranean  as part of Operation Substance. Together the destroyers escorted the troopship , forming Convoy GM1, carried servicemen to Gibraltar before taking passage to Malta.

Service in the Eastern Mediterranean

Avon Vale was detached from the convoy to escort the damaged Manchester on her return passage to Gibraltar. During August, Avon Vale was deployed in convoy defence at Gibraltar, from where she escorted Convoy HG72 on 2 September on its passage from Gibraltar to Liverpool, along with the destroyers Nestor,  and the sloop . Avon Vale was then nominated for service in the eastern Mediterranean, taking passage through Cape of Good Hope and the Indian Ocean, joining the flotilla at Alexandria in November. The destroyer was then deployed for support of the Tobruk garrison.

On 27 November Avon Vale was deployed with the sloop  as escorts for the merchantman SS Hanne taking supplies of munitions to Tobruk. The ships were attacked by the German submarine , which torpedoed and sank Parramatta. Avon Vale rescued the only twenty survivors from the sloop. On 30 November Avon Vale escorted another convoy, AT1, to Tobruk with the escort destroyer . The convoy was made up of the armed boarding vessels and the merchantman SS Kirkland which carried petrol. On 2 December the destroyer arrived at Tobruk with AT1, sailing back from Tobruk with Farndale on 5 December as convoy TA1.  The convoy found itself under air attacks, during which SS Chakdina was sunk. Chakdina was carrying prisoners of war, amongst them General Ravenstein, who was rescued by Farndale.

In January 1942, Avon Vale continued in her operations in support of Tobruk. On 12 February Avon Vale formed part of the escort for Convoy MW9A, with the cruiser , destroyers ,  Heythrop and Eridge, which found itself under heavy and sustained air attacks on 13 February.

Action in the Mediterranean
On 20 March the destroyer joined the escort for Convoy MW10 to Malta, with Carlisle and ships of the Fifth Destroyer Flotilla, which was covered by cruisers and destroyers of Mediterranean Fleet. On 22 March the convoy sustained dive bombing attacks, the whole movement done under threat of surface action with Italian heavy units including the battleship  and three cruisers. Avon Vale sustained damage during these air attacks, and further damage was done after she was involved in a collision. The engagement by the covering force was able to prevent a full attack on the convoy.

On 29 March Avon Vale was nominated for return to the United Kingdom for repairs. The destroyer met escort duties for the damaged cruiser  during the patched cruiser's passage from Malta to Gibraltar. In April the destroyer left Gibraltar for Falmouth, where she was taken in hand at a commercial shipyard.

Repairs and escort duties

From May to June the destroyer was under repair, carrying post repair trials in July; during this period Avon Vale was nominated for service by the Western Approaches Command for the defence of convoys to and from Western Africa. After completing her work-up process, the destroyer joined Western Approaches Command for convoy defence. From August to September the Avon Vale was transferred to Freetown in continuation of her services.

In October, Avon Vale began Atlantic convoy defence duties in continuation from Freetown. On 20 October she joined military convoy WS23, departing from Freetown with the cruiser ,  and the Greek destroyer Kanaris as escort during part of the passage to the Cape of Good Hope.

On 23 October the destroyer detached from WS23 upon being relieved by the sloop  and the cruiser , returning to Freetown. Avon Vale then passed to Gibraltar to escort military convoys before the allied landings in North Africa. On 8 November Avon Vale joined the Central Naval Task Force to support the landings at Oran. The destroyer was then released for convoy escort duties, a role which was carried out all through December in support of military operations in North Africa.

Further damage

On 29 January Avon Vale suffered major damage after she was hit by an aerial torpedo, which destroyed the whole of the bow structure of the destroyer. The aft section was towed back to Gibraltar by the escort destroyer . Temporary repairs were carried out in February to ensure Avon Vale could be towed back safely for permanent repairs. In February the passage had to be deferred until a suitable convoy was available. From March to May the destroyer was deployed at Gibraltar awaiting tow, until she was towed back to the United Kingdom on 25 June as part of convoy MKS15.

Avon Vale arrived in the UK on 7 July and was taken in hand for repair at HM Dockyard Chatham on 22 July. The forward structure was rebuilt, the whole repairs taking from August to December. The destroyer was under refit between January and March 1944, when she was nominated for transfer to the Royal Hellenic Navy, to be renamed the HHMS Aegaion. However, this transfer was not carried out because of the mutinous conduct of Greek mariners which manned Royal Navy units at Alexandria.

In April Avon Vale carried out her post repair harbour trials, which were completed on 14 April with the commencement of the destroyer's sea trials. In May, upon completing the trials, and achieving worked-up service, the destroyer was nominated for convoy escort duties during the allied landings in Normandy.

On 6 June Avon Vale was deployed at Portsmouth as part of Force L. The destroyer sailed from Solent with the escort of the Follow-up Convoy L1 from Nore. This escort was made up of the trawler  and the 143rd MMS Flotilla.

Back to the Mediterranean
In July the destroyer was deployed for convoy defence. In August she was taken again under repairs in a Tyne commercial shipyard, from where she was nominated for service with the 22nd Destroyer Flotilla in the Mediterranean. Upon completing these repairs, Avon Vale took passage to join the flotilla at Alexandria. In September she was deployed with the flotilla in the Eastern Mediterranean, taking part in a number of operations to occupy several islands after the surrender of Italy. Avon Vale was then transferred to the Adriatic for convoy defence, patrols and in support of shore operations. In December the destroyer was nominated for service in the East Indies after a refit in the United Kingdom.

In January 1945 the Avon Vale joined the 16th Destroyer Flotilla, based at Harwich, pending her refit prior to service in the Indies. The refit was arranged at the port of Taranto, Italy. The destroyer was taken in hand for refit in March, which was completed in May. Upon completing the refit, the destroyer returned to the United Kingdom, for pay off and the recommissioning for her service overseas. The recommissioning occurred in June, while a work-up for operational service in the Mediterranean was carried out in July. In August the deployment was cancelled, and Avon Vale returned to the United Kingdom for pay off and a reduction to reserve.

Post war status
Avon Vale paid-off at Devonport, and was laid up in reserve at Plymouth on 10 December 1945. The destroyer was transferred to the Sheerness Reserve Fleet after a refit at HM Dockyard Sheerness in 1949. When Sheerness Division was closed, Avon Vale was transferred to Hartlepool and laid up there until placed on the Disposal List.  The destroyer was sold to BISCO in 1958 for demolition by TA Young at Sunderland. Avon Vale arrived in tow at the breaker's yard on 15 May of that year.

Citations

Publications
 
 English, John (1987). The Hunts: a history of the design, development and careers of the 86 destroyers of this class built for the Royal and Allied Navies during World War II. England: World Ship Society. .

External links
 The Hunt (Type II) class Escort destroyers
 La Battaglia di Mezzo Giugno 

 

Hunt-class destroyers of the Royal Navy
1940 ships
World War II destroyers of the United Kingdom
Ships built on the River Clyde